Johanne Delisle (born 18 May 1951) is a Canadian rower. She competed in the women's quadruple sculls event at the 1976 Summer Olympics.

References

1951 births
Living people
Canadian female rowers
Olympic rowers of Canada
Rowers at the 1976 Summer Olympics
Rowers from Montreal